The Sasanian monarchs were the rulers of Iran after their victory against their former suzerain, the Parthian Empire, at the Battle of Hormozdgan in 224. At its height, the Sasanian Empire spanned from Turkey and Rhodes in the west to Pakistan in the east, and also included territory in what is now the Caucasus, Yemen, UAE, Oman, Egypt, Israel, Lebanon, Syria, Jordan and Central Asia.

The Sasanian Empire was recognized as one of the main powers in the world alongside its neighboring arch rival, the Roman Empire (later the Byzantine Empire), for a period of more than 400 years. The Sasanian dynasty began with Ardashir I in 224, who was a Persian from Istakhr, and ended with Yazdegerd III in 651.

The period from 631 (when Boran died) to 632 (when Yazdgerd III takes the throne) is confusing in determining proper succession because a number of rulers who took the throne were later removed or challenged by other members of the House of Sasan. The period was one of factionalism and division within the Sasanian Empire.

Titles
Ardashir I (r. 224–242), the founder of the Sasanian Empire, introduced the title "Shahanshah of the Iranians". Ardashir's immediate successor, Shapur I (r. 240/42–270/72) chooses the titles in a precise manner in the inscription at Ka'ba-ye Zartosht. In that Shapur names four of his Sasanian predecessors with different titles and in "an ascending order of importance" by giving the title (Xwaday) "the lord" to Sasan, "the king" to Papag, "King of Kings of Iranians" to Ardashir, and "king of kings of Iranians and non-Iranians" to himself. The title "King of Kings of Iranians and non-Iranians" has also seen on a single silver coin of Shapur I, which indicates that the title was introduced after his victory over Romans and incorporation of non-Iranian lands into the Sasanian realms. The title was later used in coins of all later Sasanian kings.

Yazdegerd I's reign, marks a shift in the political perspective of the Sasanian Empire, which (originally disposed towards the West) moved to the East. The shift may have been triggered by hostile tribes in eastern Iran. The war with the Iranian Huns may have reawakened the mythical rivalry between the mythological Iranian Kayanian rulers and their Turanian enemies, which is illustrated by Younger Avestan texts. The title of Ramshahr (peacekeeper in [his] dominion) was added to the traditional "King of Kings of the Iranians and non-Iranians" on Yazdegerd I's coins. In the Middle Persian heroic poem Ayadgar-i Zariran (The Testament of Zarer), the title was used by the last Kayanian monarch (Vishtaspa) and occurs in the 10th-century Zoroastrian Denkard. Sasanian interest in Kayanian ideology and history would continue until the end of the empire. Bahram V, on some rare coins minted in Pars, used the title of kirbakkar ("beneficent").

The reign of Yazdegerd II marks the start of a new inscription on the Sasanian coins; mazdēsn bay kay ("The Mazda-worshipping majesty, the king"), which displays his fondness of the Kayanians, who also used the title of kay. Under Peroz I, the traditional titulature of šāhānšāh ("King of Kings") is omitted on his coins, and only the two aspects of kay Pērōz ("King Peroz") are displayed. However, a seal demonstrates that the traditional titulature was still used, which indicates that coins do not with certainty display the full formal titulature of the Sasanian monarchs. His brother and successor, Balash, used the title of hukay ("the good king").

Kavad I was the last Sasanian monarch to have kay inscribed on his coins—the last one issued in 513. The regular obverse inscription on his coins simply has his name; in 504, however, the slogan abzōn ("may he prosper/increase") was added. Khosrow II, during his second reign, added the ideogram GDH, meaning xwarrah ("royal splendor") on his coins. He combined this together with the word abzōt ("he has increased"), making the full inscription thus read as: "Khosrow, he has increased the royal splendor" (Khūsrōkhwarrah abzōt). The title of King of Kings was also restored on his coins. His two successors, Kavad II and Ardashir III, refrained from using the title, seemingly in order distance themselves from Khosrow II.

The king
The head of the Sasanian Empire was the [shahanshah] (king of kings), also simply known as the shah (king). His health and welfare were always important and the phrase “May you be immortal" was used to reply to him with. By looking on the Sasanian coins which appeared from the 6th-century and afterward, a moon and sun are noticeable. The meaning of the moon and sun, in the words of the Iranian historian [Touraj Daryaee], “suggest that the king was at the center of the world and the sun and moon revolved around him. In effect, he was the “king of the four corners of the world," which was an old Mesopotamian idea." The king saw all other rulers, such as the Romans, Turks, and Chinese, as being beneath him. The king wore colorful clothes, makeup, a heavy crown, while his beard was decorated with gold. The early Sasanian kings considered themselves of divine descent; they called themselves for “bay" (divine).

When the king went to the publicity, he was hidden behind a curtain, and had some of his men in front of him, whose duty was to keep the masses away from the king and to make his way clear. When one came to the king, he/she had to prostrate before him, also known as proskynesis. The king was guarded by a group of royal guards, known as the pushtigban. On other occasions, the king was protected by a group of palace guards, known as the darigan. Both of these groups were enlisted from royal families of the Sasanian Empire, and were under the command of the hazarbed, who was in charge of the king's safety, controlled the entrance of the kings palace, presented visitors to the king, and was allowed to be given military command or used in negotiations. The hazarbed was also allowed in some cases to serve as the royal executioner. During Nowruz (Iranian new year) and Mihragan (Mihr's day), the king would hold a speech.

List of rulers
The table below lists the rulers of the Sasanian Empire.

See also
 Sasanian family tree
 List of Parthian kings
 List of Iranian dynasties

Notes

References

Sources
 
 
 
 
  
 

 
 
 
 
 
 
 

 
Sasanian
Sasanian Empire-related lists
Lists of monarchs
Monarchs of Persia